The following is a list of characters that appear in the Canadian drama television series The Border.

Main characters

Immigration and Customs Security
Immigration and Custom Security (ICS) is a fictional federal agency established by the Government of Canada to deal with trans-border issues in criminal and terrorist cases, based at the former Rochester ferry terminal in Toronto. It is implied that Public Safety Canada has ICS under its subordination.

ICS is an armed federal agency, similar to most Canadian law enforcement agencies like the Royal Canadian Mounted Police. As such, ICS personnel are equipped with small arms such as handguns. Other small arms such as shotguns and submachine guns are readily available when needed according to the situation.

Department of Homeland Security

Recurring characters

Canadian Government

Her Majesty's Secret Intelligence Service (MI6)

Civilians

References

External links
 

Border
Border